The Boughton-Haight House is a historic house located at 73-75 South Hamilton Street in Poughkeepsie, Dutchess County, New York.

Description and history 
It was built in about 1875 and is a three-story, four-bay wide, brick double townhouse designed in the Italianate style. It features round arch windows, cast iron lintels and sills, and brownstone front steps.

It was added to the National Register of Historic Places on November 26, 1982.

References

Houses on the National Register of Historic Places in New York (state)
Italianate architecture in New York (state)
Houses completed in 1875
Houses in Poughkeepsie, New York
National Register of Historic Places in Poughkeepsie, New York